Kiri-sute gomen ( or ) is an old Japanese expression dating back to the feudal era right to strike (right of samurai to kill commoners for perceived affronts). Samurai had the right to strike with their sword at anyone of a lower class who compromised their honour.

Etymology
Kiri-sute gomen translates literally as "authorization to cut and leave [the body of the victim]." Contrary to popular belief, this exact term did not originate in the Edo period.

Conditions
 
Because the right was defined as a part of self defence, kiri-sute gomen had a set of tight rules. The strike had to follow immediately after the offence, meaning that the striker could not attack someone for a past grievance or after a substantial amount of time. Also, due to the right being self-defence, it was not permissible to deliver a further coup de grâce if a blow had been successfully applied. Anyone who was at the receiving end had the right to defend themselves by wakizashi, a situation most common in the case of a higher samurai exercising the right against a lower ranked samurai as those would always carry wakizashi.

Some professions, like doctors and midwives, were not eligible targets for kiri-sute gomen while at work or heading to their workplaces, as their jobs often required them to push the boundaries of honor. This exception was called .

In any case, the samurai performing the act had to prove that his action was right. After striking down his victim, the user was required to report the incident to nearby government official, give his version of the facts and provide at least one witness who corroborated it, and he was expected to spend the next 20 days at home as a proof of contrition. The last one applied even after favorable verdict, although it is unclear whether it applied to the physical author of the death or his superior in case the kill was performed by proxy. Moreover, the homicidal weapon could be confiscated if an investigation was necessary or as a warning for a kill whose justification was feeble, and it was only given back after the 20 days.

Performing kiri-sute gomen without justification was severely punished. The guilty party could be destituted from his job and could even be sentenced to death or forced to commit seppuku. His family would be affected too if his properties and titles were removed from his inheritance.

History
Samurai visiting Edo often did all they could to obtain favorable verdicts, as an unfavorable court decision there could be even considered an act of rebellion against the shogunate. It was usual that clan elders presented gifts to officials in order to secure their support, to the point it was said magistrates earned more through those bribes than through their own salaries. It was also advisable for a samurai to go out accompanied by servants and other clan members who could serve as witnesses if it was necessary.

A popular incident tells how a commoner bumped into Saiheiji Tomo, treasurer of the Owari-Tokugawa family, and ignored him further when Tomo demanded him to apologize. Feeling merciful, the samurai offered the peasant his wakizashi so he had a chance to defend himself, but instead, the commoner decided to run away with his wakizashi, causing further dishonor. The incident resulted in Tomo being disowned from the Owari-Tokugawa clan. He later regained his honor by seeking out the commoner, collecting the wakizashi and killing the whole family.

The Namamugi Incident (sometimes known as the "Kanagawa incident" or "Richardson affair") was a political crisis that followed the 1862 murder of British merchant Charles Lennox Richardson, who was killed by the armed retinue of Shimazu Hisamitsu, regent of the Satsuma Domain, on a road in Namamugi near Kawasaki. Europeans protested that the incident violated their extraterritoriality in Japan, while the Japanese argued Richardson had disrespected Shimazu and was justifiably killed under the kiri-sute gomen rule. British demands for compensation and failure by the Satsuma to respond resulted in the Bombardment of Kagoshima (or Anglo-Satsuma War) in August 1863.

Another happening features a nobleman named Kuranosuke Toda, whose kago was shoved by a commoner trying to cross through. Toda's bodyguard demanded an apology, but the peasant insulted them instead. The samurai then threw him to the ground, but the peasant still started a shouting match. Watching it from his litter, Toda ordered the man to be cut down. After reporting the incident, the judges approved Toda's decision and did not condemn him. 

An instance of Kiri sute gomen is described in the story of the Hōgyū Jizō statue. A boy, whose father was killed by Kiri sute gomen, made 100 stone statues in later life, in Kumamoto.

See also
Deadly force
Honour killing
Licence to kill (concept)
Private war
Summary execution
Tsujigiri

Notes

References
John Pierre Mertz, "Tokugawa Cultural Chronology", (version 2008.01.30; www4.ncsu.edu/~fljpm), page 2. Retrieved on 2008-08-16.

Japanese words and phrases
Feudal Japan
Japanese culture
Society of Japan